Thomas Rufenacht (born February 22, 1985) is a Swiss-American professional ice hockey player who is currently playing with HC Ambrì-Piotta of the National League (NL).

Playing career
On November 4, 2013, Rüfenacht agreed to a three-year contract with SC Bern. On October 27, 2016, he signed a three-year contract extension with Bern worth CHF 1.2 million.

On November 5, 2019, Rüfenacht was signed to a two-year contract extension worth CHF 1.4 mio by Bern, through the 2021/22 season.

International play
Rufenacht was named to the Switzerland men's national ice hockey team for competition at the 2014 IIHF World Championship.

Career statistics

Regular season and playoffs

International

References

External links

1985 births
Living people
HC Ambrì-Piotta players
SC Bern players
Genève-Servette HC players
Lausanne HC players
HC Lugano players
Ice hockey players at the 2018 Winter Olympics
Olympic ice hockey players of Switzerland
SCL Tigers players
Swiss ice hockey forwards
EHC Visp players
EV Zug players
Sportspeople from the canton of Lucerne